Medvedica is a dispersed settlement in the hills south of Šent Jurij in the  Municipality of Grosuplje in central Slovenia. The area is part of the historical region of Lower Carniola. The municipality is now included in the Central Slovenia Statistical Region.

Gallery

References

External links

Medvedica on Geopedia

Populated places in the Municipality of Grosuplje